Throughout its history, Darfur has been the home to several cultures and kingdoms, like the mythical Tora or the Daju and Tunjur kingdoms. The recorded history of Darfur begins in the seventeenth century, with the foundation of the Fur Sultanate by the Keira dynasty. In 1875, the Anglo-Egyptian Co-dominion in Khartoum ended the dynasty. The British allowed Darfur a measure of autonomy until formal annexation in 1916. However, the region remained underdeveloped through the period of colonial rule and after independence in 1956. The majority of national resources were directed toward the riverine Arabs clustered along the Nile near Khartoum. This pattern of structural inequality and overly underdevelopment resulted in increasing restiveness among Darfuris. The influence of regional geopolitics and war by proxy, coupled with economic hardship and environmental degradation, from soon after independence led to sporadic armed resistance from the mid-1980s. The continued violence culminated in an armed resistance movement around 2003.

Kingdoms of Darfur

Developments in the region are dependent on the terrain and climate, as it is composed mostly of semi-arid plains that cannot support a dense population. The one exception is the area in and around the Jebal Marra mountains. It was from bases in these mountains that a series of groups expanded to control the region.

This region is extremely poorly known and documented, especially the earlier periods. Archaeology has hardly made any progress, in part thanks to the continuing state of warfare which hinders research. Documentary history is also rather sparse, al-Idrisi, writing in 1154 is the first author to offer information about the region that provides any concrete detail. The Sicilian geographer describes the Tajuwa as pagans inhabiting the region adjacent to the Nile Valley kingdoms, who possessed two towns, the first and capital being Tajuwa and a second town lying six stages away from it called Samna, which was destroyed according to a traveler in the region, by the governor of the kingdom of Nuba. The bulk of the inhabitants were nomadic with large numbers of cattle and camels, but subject to raiding by their neighbors.

Tora
Oral traditions record a race of white giants called Tora, who allegedly reached Darfur from the north, perhaps indicating a Berber origin. They are credited to have introduced monumental stone architecture and sophisticated agriculture. 
By the 12th century, the Tora have been succeeded by the Daju.

Daju Period
The Daju, inhabitants of Jebel Marra, appear to have been the dominant group in Darfur in the earliest period recorded. How long they ruled is uncertain, little being known of them save a list of kings. Dr Arkell (1959) mentions that the Daju are originally meroites who re-established their capital at Jebel Gadir (Gadir was a Daju king who died and buried beneath this Jebel which attributed to him) in the recent Kordofan region. Due to an attack from Nubia about 1100 AD, and for a desire of expansion sultan Ahmed el-Daj relocated his capital to Jebel Marra. He won a battle against the Nubians at Wadi el-Malik and this made him a hero and Emperor for this event the Wadi took his name and his people known, for his fame, the Daju. The Nubians stroke the Daju empire again and this caused the destruction of the city of Semna east of el-Fashir. During this period the name of the country was Dardaju (land of the Daju). According to tradition the last sultan experienced a coup after his order to relocate Jebel Um-Kardoos and the Daju dynasty migrated westward after the famous Kasifurogei tale about the 15th century, the Tunjur assumed power and the country renamed Dartunjur (land of Tunjur).  The Egyptian historian al-Maqrizi, writing about 1400, described "Taju" as being a fairly powerful kingdom lying between Kanem and the Nile Valley.

The Tunjur
The Tunjur reached Darfur by way of Bornu and Wadai. The first Tunjur king is said to have been Ahmed el-Makur, who married the daughter of the last Daju monarch. Ahmed reduced many chiefs to submission, and under him the country prospered. His great-grandson, the sultan Dali, a celebrated figure in Darfur histories, was on his mother's side a Fur, and thus brought the dynasty closer to the people it ruled. Dali divided the country into provinces, and established a penal code, which, under the title of Kitab Dali or Dali's Book, is still preserved, and differs in some respects from Quranic law.

Darfur Sultanate

Suleiman Solon (or "Sulayman", usually distinguished by the Fur epithet Solon, meaning "the Arab" or "the Red", Browne stated that he was of a Daju origins) reigned from 1603 to 1637, and was a great warrior and a devoted Muslim; he is considered as the founder of the Keira dynasty, note that the Fur people have no origins yet to know. O'Fahey (1982) states that they are originally Fartit brought from the Central Africa long ago. and the Darfur Sultanate. Soleiman's grandson, Ahmed Bukr (c. 1682 – c. 1722), made Islam the religion of the state, and increased the prosperity of the country by encouraging immigration from Bornu and Bagirmi. His rule extended east of the Nile as far as the banks of the Atbara. Throughout its history, the sultanate engaged in wars with Sennar, Wadai, Arab tribes and eventually the Egyptians.

In 1856, a Khartoum businessman, al-Zubayr Rahma, began operations in the land south of Darfur and set up a network of trading posts defended by well-armed forces and soon had a sprawling state under his rule. This area known as the Bahr el Ghazal had long been the source of the goods that Darfur would trade to Egypt and North Africa, especially slaves and ivory. The natives of Bahr el Ghazal paid tribute to Darfur, and these were the chief articles of merchandise sold by the Darfurians to the Egyptian traders along the Darb el-Arbaʿīn road to Asyut. Al-Zubayr redirected this flow of goods to Khartoum and the Nile.

Sultan Ibrahim challenged al-Zubayr who allied himself with his former enemies the Egyptians. The following war resulted in the destruction of the sultanate. Ibrahim was slain in battle in the autumn of 1874, and his uncle Hassab Alla, who sought to maintain the independence of his country, was captured in 1875 by the troops of the khedive, and removed to Cairo with his family.

Egyptian rule

The Darfurians were restive under the rule of Egypt, itself under British rule. Various revolts were suppressed, but in 1879 the British General Gordon (then Governor-general of Sudan) suggested the reinstatement of the ancient royal family. This was not done, and in 1881 Slatin Bey (Sir Rudolf von Slatin) was made governor of the province.

Slatin defended the province against the forces of the self-proclaimed Mahdi Muhammad Ahmad, who were led by a Rizeigat Sheikh named Madibbo, but Slatin Pasha was obliged to surrender 1883, and Darfur was incorporated in the Mahdi's dominions. The Darfurians found his rule as irksome as that of the Egyptians had been, and a state of almost constant warfare ended in the gradual retirement of the Mahdi's forces from Darfur.

Ahmad's successor, Abdallahi ibn Muhammad, was a Darfuri of the minor Ta’isha tribe of cattle-herders.  Abdallahi forced warriors of the Western tribes to move to the capital Omdurman and fight for him, sparking rebellions by the Rizeigat and Kababish nomads.

Following the overthrow of Abdallahi at Omdurman in 1898, the new (Anglo-Egyptian) Sudan government recognized (1899) Ali Dinar, a grandson of Mohammed-el-Fadhl, as sultan of Darfur, in exchange for an annual tribute of 500 pound sterling. Under Ali Dinar, who during the Mahdi's era had been kept a prisoner in Omdurman, Darfur enjoyed a period of peace and a de facto return to independence.

British rule

However, the British allowed Darfur de jure autonomy until they became convinced during the First World War that the sultanate was falling under the influence of the Ottoman Empire (present-day Turkey), invaded, and incorporated the region into Sudan in 1916.

Within Anglo-Egyptian Sudan, the bulk of resources were devoted toward Khartoum and Blue Nile Province, leaving the rest of the country relatively undeveloped. The inhabitants of the river side states, referred to themselves as the awlad al-beled ("children of the country") in pride over their primary role and referred to the Westerners as awlad al-gharb ("children of the west"), an implicit slur.  Meanwhile, the "Africans" were pejoratively known as zurga ("Blacks").  Over the course of the Condominium, 56% of all investment occurred in Khartoum, Kassala and Northern Province versus 17% for both Kurdufan and Darfur, resulting in about 5-6% in Darfur as Kurdufan received the bulk of funds in the West. This was despite the provinces in the Nile Valley having a population of 2.3 million versus 3 million people in the West. Darfur, like the rest of Sudan outside the Nile Valley, remained an undeveloped backwater even as independence was achieved in 1956.

National independence
After independence, it became a major power base for the Umma Party, led by Sadiq al-Mahdi.  By the                                                                                      1960s, some Darfuris were beginning to question the neglect of the region by the Umma, despite their consistent political support.  Disillusionment with the religious sect-based parties, Khatmiyya Sufi/Democratic Unionist Party in the East and Ansar/Umma in the West, led to a temporary rise of regionally-based parties, including the Darfur Development Front (DDF).  During the discussions of the proposed Islamic constitution proposed by Hassan al-Turabi, Muslims from Darfur, the Nuba Mountains and the Red Sea Hills joined the Southerners in opposition, perceiving the constitution as a ploy by the center to consolidate their dominance of the marginalized regions. The fracturing of the Umma led to the first political demagoguery attempting to split the "Africans" from the "Arabs" in the 1968 elections, a difficult task as they were substantially intermarried and could not be distinguished by skin tone. Sadiq al-Mahdi, calculating that the Fur and other "African" tribes formed a majority of the electorate, allied with the DDF in blaming "the Arabs" for Darfur's neglect. This left Sadiq's opponent, his uncle Imam al-Hadi, courting Baggara using the rhetoric of "Arabism" to offer hope of somehow being a part of the wealthy center.

To this underdevelopment and domestic political tension was added cross-border instability with Chad. Premiere al-Mahdi allowed FROLINAT, the guerilla movement trying to overthrow Chadian President François Tombalbaye, to establish rear bases in Darfur in 1969. However, FROLINAT factional infighting killed dozens within Darfur in 1971, leading Sudanese President Gaafar Nimeiry to expel the group. This was further complicated by the interest of new Libyan leader Muammar al-Gaddafi in the Chadian conflict. Obsessed with the vision of creating a band of Sahelian nations that were both Muslim and culturally Arab, Gaddafi made an offer to Nimeiry to merge their two countries in 1971. However, Gaddafi was disillusioned with Nimeiry's Arab credentials after the Sudanese president signed the 1972 Addis Ababa Agreement, ending the First Sudanese Civil War with the South. Libya claimed the Aozou Strip, began supporting the FROLINAT against the black Christian Tombalbaye, and supporting Arab supremacist militants to achieve his goals by force, including the Islamic Legion and the Arab Gathering in Darfur, which claimed the province to have an "Arab" nature. Nimeiry, concerned by the warm welcome Gaddafi had given to al-Mahdi, his exiled opposition, began to encourage the fragile administration of Félix Malloum, the new Chadian president after Tombalbaye's 1975 assassination. In retaliation, Gaddafi sent a 1200-man force across the desert to assault Khartoum directly. The Libyan force was barely defeated after three days of house to house fighting and Nimeiry chose to support the most anti-Libyan of the various Chadian leaders, Hissène Habré, giving his Armed Forces of the North sanctuary in Darfur. All of these external events buffeted the traditional structure of Darfuri society. Tribes that had seen themselves in local terms were asked to declare if they were "progressive, revolutionary Arabs" or "reactionary, anti-Arab Africans". The Khartoum government, rather than trying to calm these new ethnic tensions, instead exacerbated them when it seemed useful in the Sudan-Libya-Chad struggle.

Civil wars

Increasing shortage of arable land
In 1979, Nimeiry appointed to Darfur the only provincial governor who was not of the local population. The appointment of a Nile Valley awlad al-beled, chosen to oversee the support to Habré, sparked riots by Darfuri across Sudan in which three students were killed. Nimeiry relented due to fears that his anti-Libyan bases were being jeopardized.

A major factor in the intensification of conflict is control over the shrinking supply of arable land. In a longer term cycle, the gradual reduction in annual precipitation, coupled with a growing population, had begun a cycle in which increased use of arable land along the southern edge of the Sahara increased the rate of desertification, which in turn increased the use of the remaining arable land. Drought from the mid-1970s to early 1980s led to massive immigration from northern Darfur and Chad into the central farming belt. In 1983 and 1984, the rains failed. When the Khartoum government refused to heed warnings of critical crop failure because they feared it would affect the administration's image abroad the Governor of the Fur-dominated administration in Darfur resigned in protest. The region was plunged into a horrific famine. When 60–80,000 Darfuris walked across the country to Khartoum seeking food, the government declared them to be Chadian refugees and trucked them to Kurdufan in "Operation Glorious Return", only to see them walk back to Khartoum as there was no food in Kurdufan. The famine killed an estimated 95,000 Darfuris out of a population of 3.1 million and it was clear that the deaths had been entirely preventable. Attempts by some commentators to attribute subsequent political instability solely to climate change have been firmly rebuffed. A scholar at the Woodrow Wilson International Center noted, "The challenge is to avoid over-simplistic or deterministic formulations that equate climate change inexorably with genocide or terrorism, as some less careful commentators have done."

Second Sudanese Civil War in 1983

The incompetence of the regime, combined with the start of the Second Sudanese Civil War in 1983, proved unbearable for the country and Nimeiry was overthrown on 5 April 1985. Sadiq al-Mahdi came out of exile, making a deal with Gaddafi, which he had no intention of honoring, that he would turn over Darfur to Libya if he was supplied with the funds to win the upcoming elections.

Nimeiry had been heavily supported by the United States and the military junta that had taken power moved quickly to discontinue pro-American policies. Beginning in August 1985, Libya began sending military/humanitarian convoys from Benghazi, including an 800-strong military force that set up base in Al-Fashir and began arming the local Baggara tribes, whom Gaddafi considered to be his local Arab allies. By the time that Libyan relations with the United States had worsened so that by the time American planes bombed Tripoli in April 1986, Libya was providing key logistical and air support to Sudanese offensives against the Sudan People's Liberation Army in the rebel South. Meanwhile, the famine had severely upset the structure of Darfuri society.  The farmers had claimed every available bit of land to farm or forage for food, closing off the traditional routes used by the herders. The herders, faced with watching their animals die of starvation in the desiccated landscape, tried to force the routes south open, attacking farmers who tried to block their path and shedding blood. Darfur was awash in small arms from the various neighboring conflicts and stories spread of herders raiding farming villages for all of their animals or villagers who had armed themselves in self-defense. To Darfuris facing starvation, the dichotomous ideology of African versus Arab began to have explanatory power. Amongst some stationary Africans, the ideas that uncaring Arabs in Khartoum had let the famine happen and then Darfuri Arabs armed by their Libyan allies had attacked African farmers began to gain credence. Similarly, semi-nomadic Darfuri Arabs began to seriously consider that Africans had vindictively tried to punish them for the famine by trying to keep them from pastureland and that perhaps the difference between awlad al-beled and awlad al-gharb was not as great as between Arab and zurga.

In December 1991, a Sudan People's Liberation Army force that included Darfuri Daud Bolad entered Darfur in the hopes of spreading the southern rebellion to the West. Before Bolad's force could reach the Marrah Mountains they were attacked by a combined force of regular army and Beni Halba militia mounted on horses. Dozens of Fur villages that had not resisted the SPLA force were burned in reprisal.

In 1994, Darfur was divided into three federal states within Sudan: Northern (Shamal), Southern (Janub), and Western (Gharb) Darfur. Northern Darfur's capital is Al Fashir; Southern Darfur's is Nyala; and West Darfur's is Geneina. The division was the idea of Ali al Haj, Minister of Federal Affairs, who hoped that by dividing the Fur so they did not form a majority in any state that it would allow Islamist candidates to be elected.

Fighting in West Darfur in 1998

According to Human Rights Watch, hostilities broke out in West Darfur in 1998. The 1998 clashes, were relatively minor, but more than 5000 Masalit were displaced. Clashes resumed in 1999 when nomadic herdsmen again moved south earlier than usual.

The 1999 clashes were  bloodier, with  many hundreds killed, including a number of Arab tribal chiefs. The government brought in military forces in an attempt to quell the violence and took direct control of security. A reconciliation conference held in 1999 agreed on compensation. Many Masalit intellectuals and notables were arrested, imprisoned, and tortured in the towns as government-supported Arab militias began to attack Masalit villages; a number of Arab chiefs and civilians were also killed in these clashes.

In 2000, a clandestine group consisting mostly of Darfuris published the Black Book, a dissident manuscript detailing the domination of the north and the impoverishment of the other regions. It was widely discussed, despite attempts to censor it, and many of the writers went on to help found the rebel Justice and Equality Movement.

War in Darfur from 2003

 
The region became the scene of a rebellion in 2003 against the Arab-dominated Sudanese government, with two local rebel groups - the Justice and Equality Movement (JEM) and the Sudanese Liberation Army (SLA) - accusing the government of oppressing non-Arabs in favor of Arabs. The government was also accused of neglecting the Darfur region of Sudan. In response, the government mounted a campaign of aerial bombardment supporting ground attacks by an Arab militia, the Janjaweed. The government-supported Janjaweed were accused of committing major human rights violations, including mass killing, looting, and systematic rape of the non-Arab population of Darfur.  They have frequently burned down whole villages, driving the surviving inhabitants to flee to refugee camps, mainly in Darfur and Chad; many of the camps in Darfur are surrounded by Janjaweed forces. By the summer of 2004, 50,000 to 80,000 people had been killed and at least a million had been driven from their homes, causing a major humanitarian crisis in the region.

On September 18, 2004, the UN Security Council passed Resolution 1564, which called for a Commission of Inquiry on Darfur to assess the Sudanese conflict. On January 31, 2005, the UN released a 176-Page report saying that while there were mass murders and rapes, they could not label it as genocide because "genocidal intent appears to be missing". Many activists, however, refer to the crisis in Darfur as a genocide, including the Save Darfur Coalition and the Genocide Intervention Network. These organizations point to statements by former U.S. Secretary of State Colin Powell, referring to the conflict as a genocide. Other activists organizations, such as Amnesty International, while calling for international intervention, avoid the use of the term genocide.

In May 2006 the main rebel group, the Sudanese Liberation Movement, agreed to a draft peace agreement with the Sudanese government. On May 5, both sides signed the agreement, which was drafted in Abuja, Nigeria.

SaveDarfur.org claims that as of May 2007, up to 400,000 Darfurians have died as a result of this conflict.

On 31 August 2020, a peace agreement was signed between the Sudanese authorities and rebel factions to end armed hostilities. However, major clashes occurred in December 2020 and January 2021.

References

Further reading 

 Abdul-Jalil, Musa, and Jon D. Unruh. "Land rights under stress in Darfur: A volatile dynamic of the conflict." War & Society 32.2 (2013): 156-181 online. 
 Arkell, A. J., A History of Darfur, Sudan Notes and Records, 32-33 (1951-2), 37-275.
 Arkell, A. J., Medieval History of Darfur and Nilotic Sudan. Sudan Notes and Records, Vol. XL, pp. 44–47.
 Barltrop, R. Darfur and the International Community: The Challenges of Conflict Resolution in Sudan (I. B. Tauris, 2011).
 Bassil, N. R. The Post-Colonial State and Civil War in Sudan: The Origins of Conflict in Darfur (I. B. Tauris, 2013).
 Daly, M.W., Darfur's Sorrow:  A History of Destruction and Genocide, Cambridge 2010.
 Danielová, Veronika. "Darfur Crisis of 2003: Analysis of the Darfur Conflict from the Times of First Clashes to the Present Day." Ethnologia Actualis 1.14 (2014): 37-59.
 Ehret, Christopher: The Civilizations of Africa: A history  to 1800. (2002) pp. 307–8.
 Etefa, Tsega. The Origins of Ethnic Conflict in Africa: Politics and Violence in Darfur, Oromia, and the Tana Delta (Palgrave Macmillan, 2019) excerpt
 Foerstel, K. "Crisis in Darfur" CQ Global Researcher (2008). 2, 243-270. online
 Hagan, John, and Wenona Rymond-Richmond, eds. Darfur and the crime of genocide (Cambridge UP, 2009).
 Herr, Alexis, Darfur Genocide: The Essential Reference Guide (2020) excerpt
 Jemirade, Dele. "The failure of humanitarian intervention and the role of NGOs in Darfur." African Journal of History and Culture 13.1 (2021): 43-55. online
  Johnson, Douglas H. The Root Causes of Sudan's Civil Wars (Indiana UP, 2003), ISBN 0-253-21584-6
 Kiernan, Ben. Blood and Soil: A World History of Genocide and Extermination from Sparta to Darfur (2009) excerpt
 Nachtigal, G. transl. H. Fisher, Sahara and Sudan. IV Wadai and Darfur, (vol. III, 1889), London 1971.
 O'Fahey, R. S. The Darfur Sultanate: A History, London 2008.
 O'Fahey, R. S. "Fur and Fartit: The History o fa Frontier," in Culture History in the Southern Sudan: Archaeology, Linguistics, and Ethnohistory, eds John Mack...
 Prunier, G., The Ambiguous Genocide (Cornell UP, 2005).
 Savelsberg, Joachim J. "Global Human Rights Organizations and National Patterns: Amnesty International’s Responses to Darfur." Societies Without Borders 12.2 (2021): 13+ online.
 Totten, Samuel, and Eric Markusen, eds. Genocide in Darfur: Investigating the Atrocities in the Sudan (2006); essays by experts.

Primary sources
 Steidle, Brian. The Devil Came on Horseback: Bearing Witness to the Genocide in Darfur (2008) excerpt
 Totten, Samuel. ed. An Oral and Documentary History of the Darfur Genocide (2 vol Praeger Security International, 2010). excerpt

External links
 "Sudan — Darfur: Humanitarian Profile," 2007

Darfur
History of Sudan